This is a list of lighthouses in South Carolina.

Notes
A. This lighthouse was built in honor of South Carolina's governors. It is privately maintained and an unofficial aid to navigation.
B. The deactivation date for the Haig Point Range Lights is disputed among sources. Click on the article for more information.
C. Not much is known about this set of range lights. The two structures were built in 1871 after the second Morris Island lighthouse was destroyed in the civil war, as navigation was needed in the area.
D. Listed on the light list as late as 1898.

References

South Carolina
Lighthouses
Lighthouses